Murder in the Family is a 1938 British crime film directed by Albert Parker and starring Barry Jones, Jessica Tandy and Evelyn Ankers. The film's sets were designed by the art director Carmen Dillon. It was adapted from a 1936 novel of the same title by James Ronald.

Plot summary
After a wealthy woman is killed, her extended family all fall under suspicion of murder.

Cast
 Barry Jones as Stephen Osborne 
 Jessica Tandy as Ann Osborne 
 Evelyn Ankers as Dorothy Osborne 
 Donald Gray as Ted Fleming 
 Jessie Winter as Edith Osborne 
 David Markham as Michael Osborne 
 Glynis Johns as Marjorie Osborne 
 Roddy McDowall as Peter Osborne 
 Annie Esmond as Aunt Octavia 
 Rani Waller as Miss Mimms
 Charles Childerstone as uncredited

References

Bibliography
 Chibnall, Steve. Quota Quickies: The Birth of the British 'B' Film. British Film Institute, 2007.
 Low, Rachael. Filmmaking in 1930s Britain. George Allen & Unwin, 1985.
 Wood, Linda. British Films, 1927-1939. British Film Institute, 1986.

External links

1938 films
1938 crime films
Films directed by Albert Parker
British crime films
Films based on British novels
British black-and-white films
1930s English-language films
1930s British films
Quota quickies
Films shot at Wembley Studios
20th Century Fox films